Chomaq Tappeh (also Romanized as Chomāq Tappeh) is a village in Parsinah Rural District, in the Central District of Sonqor County, Kermanshah Province, Iran. At the 2006 census, its population was 221, in 53 families.

References 

Populated places in Sonqor County